Peter Chrisp (born 20 May 1958) is a British children's author of books on history. With over ninety books published, his various works include Blitzkrieg!, Dorling Kindersley's Ancient Egypt Revealed and Ancient Rome Revealed, The Spanish Conquests of the New World, and many more.

He first began writing history after working on the Mass-Observation archive at the University of Sussex.  He has also worked as a writer on the online project "Icons of England".

Aside from his publications in literature, he is also an artist, who has exhibited collections of his cartoons and hand-drawn postcards during Brighton Festival.In 2014, his portraits of the Magna Carta barons were displayed in an exhibition in St Edmunsbury Cathedral, and 'were very popular with visiting families and schools'.  The illustrations were later displayed as a trail on bollards around the town. In 2017, his Christmas tableaux photographs, with Lisa Wolfe, were featured in The Observer, Der Spiegel, the New Zealand Stuff.co.nz news website, and Brighton's Viva magazine. In 2019, his illustrations of the diary of Thomas Turner began appearing in a monthly column, edited by Mathew Clayton, in Caught by the River.

Since 2013, Chrisp has been writing From Swerve of Shore to Bend of Bay, a blog about James Joyce's Finnegans Wake. The blog has been featured in the Irish Times, where Chrisp was described as an 'eminent Wake scholar' and 'a self-confessed Joyce obsessive'.

Bibliography

As co-author or contributor

See also

Dorling Kindersley

References 

British children's writers
British non-fiction writers
1958 births
Living people
Postcard artists
British male writers
Male non-fiction writers